
Gmina Wapno is a rural gmina (administrative district) in Wągrowiec County, Greater Poland Voivodeship, in west-central Poland.

Villages
Gmina Wapno contains the villages and settlements of Aleksandrowo, Graboszewo, Komasin, Podolin, Rusiec, Srebrna Góra, Stołężyn and Wapno.

Neighbouring gminas
Gmina Wapno is bordered by the gminas of Damasławek, Gołańcz, Kcynia and Żnin.

References
 Polish official population figures 2006

Wapno
Wągrowiec County